Ioan Evans (born 18 July 2001) is a Welsh rugby union player, currently playing for United Rugby Championship side Cardiff. His preferred position is centre.

Cardiff
Evans was called into Cardiff's European squad ahead of their European campaign. He made his debut for Cardiff in the first round of the 2021–22 European Rugby Champions Cup against  coming on as a replacement.

References

External links
itsrugby.co.uk Profile

2001 births
Living people
Welsh rugby union players
Cardiff Rugby players
Rugby union centres
Rugby union players from Pontypridd